Nguyễn Hồng Sơn (born 20 October 2000) is a Vietnamese footballer who plays for Sài Gòn as an attacking midfielder.

In a match between U19 Vietnam and U19 Myanmar in the 2017 AFF U-18 Youth Championship, he became the fastest goal scoring player in history when the U19 Myanmar in 47 seconds.

International career

International goals

U-19

Honours
Hà Nội
V.League 1: 2018  
Vietnamese Super Cup: 2021
Quảng Nam
Vietnamese National Cup: Runner-up 2019

External links

References

Living people
Vietnamese footballers
Association football midfielders
V.League 1 players
Hanoi FC players
2000 births